Highway 42 is the highest-numbered main road on St. Thomas, U.S. Virgin Islands. It serves Mahogany Run Golf Course, a major golf course on the island, and provides access to world-famous Magens Bay beach from the eastern part of St. Thomas. Its eastern terminus is with Highway 38 near the town of Tutu, and the road runs exactly  to Highway 35 near Magens Bay.

References

42